The 2000 SMU Mustangs football team represented Southern Methodist University (SMU) as a member the Western Athletic Conference (WAC) during the 2000 NCAA Division I-A football season. Led by fourth-year head coach Mike Cavan, the Mustangs compiled an overall record of 3–9 with a mark of 2–6 in conference play, tying for sixth place in the WAC.

Schedule

Roster

References

SMU
SMU Mustangs football seasons
SMU Mustangs football